Colonel James Augustus Rooth  (13 December 1868 – 25 October 1963) was a British colonel and physician who was a member of the Royal Army Medical Corps, a member of the Royal College of Surgeons, and house surgeon at the Radcliffe Infirmary, Oxford.

Life and career
Born in London, the son of John Wilcoxon Rooth, barrister-at-law (1835–1874), and Elizabeth Cody (1825–1917), daughter of Henry Smith of Bristol. He was born in January 1869 and baptised 20 January at St Paul's Church, Camden Square.

He was educated at Highgate School and University College University of Oxford where he read history (BA 1890). He was best known as the doctor in charge of the delivery of future vaudevillian and film actors Violet and Daisy Hilton, conjoined twins born in Brighton in 1908 and the first to live to adulthood. He provided a medical testimony of them for the British Medical Journal in 1911.

He died in Hove, Sussex, in 1963.

References

1869 births
1963 deaths
Royal Army Medical Corps officers
Medical doctors from London
People educated at Highgate School
Alumni of University College, Oxford
19th-century English medical doctors
20th-century English medical doctors